P. bakeri may refer to:
 Paguristes bakeri, Holmes, 1900, a hermit crab species in the genus Paguristes
 Psilostrophe bakeri, Greene, a flowering plant species in the genus Psilostrophe native to Colorado and Idaho
 Pteris bakeri, a fern species in the genus Pteris

See also
 Bakeri (disambiguation)